Pukehou is a farming locality in southern Hawke's Bay, in the eastern North Island of New Zealand.

Pukehou is located on State Highway 2, about halfway between Hastings and Waipukurau. The locality's name (originally Pukehouhou) is Māori, and means "Hill of houhou", the 'houhou' or 'Puahou' being a small native flowering tree, Pseudopanax arboreus or Five Finger (Māori: 'Puahou' or 'Whauwhaupaku').

Christ Church, the oldest church in Hawke's Bay and the Waiapu Diocese, was built by Samuel Williams in 1859. It was constructed of local timber with roofing of hand split totara shingles and measured 40 feet by 20 feet. It was extended in both 1881 and 1893, work in the latter date including the north and south transept and chancel. It church was repaired in 1959 with the roof being repiled, repainted and reshingled, and was repainted in 1993.

The church has two significant stained glass windows. The east window was designed by John Bonnor while Karl Parsons designed the north one. The church is registered as a Category I heritage building by Heritage New Zealand.

Marae

Pukehou Marae and Keke Haunga meeting house is a meeting place of Ngāti Kekehaunga, Ngāti Pukututu and Ngāti Whatuiāpiti, of Ngāti Kahungunu.

In October 2020, the Government committed $6,020,910 from the Provincial Growth Fund to upgrade a group of 18 marae, including Pukehou Marae. The funding was expected to create 39 jobs.

Education
Pukehou School is a Year 1–8 co-educational state primary school.

Te Aute College is a Year 9–15 boys' single-sex, state integrated secondary school.

Railway station 
Pukehou had a flag station on the Palmerston North–Gisborne Line. It opened on Monday 28 August 1876, when the railway was extended from Te Aute to Waipawa as part of the Paki Paki to Waipukurau contract, which international contractors, Brogdens, were building. By 1883 there were 3 trains a day in each direction, serving a shelter shed, platform and a short siding. Stockyards were added in 1889 and, in 1912, an automatic tablet exchanger. On 8 December 1912 the name was changed to Te Aute, but Pukehou reverted to its original name on 14 September 1913. The station closed to all traffic on 31 January 1966.

One person died the following day.

References

External links 

 1890s photo of Pukehou swamp and railway

Central Hawke's Bay District
Populated places in the Hawke's Bay Region